The 2018 Kosovar Supercup was the 27th edition of the Kosovar Supercup, an annual football match played between the winners of the previous season's Kosovo Superleague and Kosovar Cup competitions. The match was played between Drita, champions of the 2017–18 Kosovo Superleague and Prishtina, who beat their opponents to win the 2018 Kosovar Cup Final. Watched by a crowd of 10,000, Drita won the match 2–1 and claimed their first Supercup title.

Match

Details
On 13 August 2018, after renovation was held a 2018 Kosovar Supercup between the winners of the 2017–18 Football Superleague of Kosovo, Drita and 2017–18 Kosovar Cup, Prishtina. Playing for the first time at the recently refurbished Fadil Vokrri Stadium.

See also 
2017–18 Football Superleague of Kosovo
2017–18 Kosovar Cup
FC Drita–FC Prishtina rivalry

References 

Supercup
Kosovar Supercup